Miss Venezuela 2014 was the 61st edition of the Miss Venezuela pageant held on October 9, 2014 at the Estudio 1 de Venevision in Caracas, Venezuela. At the end of the event, outgoing titleholder Migbelis Castellanos of Costa Oriental crowned Mariana Jiménez of Guárico as her successor.

Results 
Color key

Special Awards

Final Judges 
 Marena Bencomo – Miss Venezuela 1996.
Alexandra Braun – Actress, model and Miss Earth 2005.
 Ivo Contreras – Miss Venezuela official stylist.
Jomari Goyso – International stylist.
 Georgia Reyes – Fashion designer.
 Isabel Rodríguez – Andartu designer.
Eduardo Orozco – Venezuelan actor.
 Oscar Alejandro Pérez – Venezuelan TV Host.
 Rafael "El Pollo" Brito – Venezuelan singer.

Official Contestants
25 candidates competed for the title.

Contestants Notes 

Mariana Jiménez placed as semifinalist (Top 10) in Miss Universe 2015 in Las Vegas, Nevada, United States.
Edymar Martínez won Miss International 2015 in Tokyo, Japan.
Maira Alexandra Rodríguez placed as 2nd runner-up (Miss Earth Water) in Miss Earth 2014 in Quezon City, Philippines.
Stefany Merlin (Barinas) placed as 4th runner-up in Face of Beauty International 2015 in Kaohsiung, Taiwan.
Debora Medina (Trujillo) was appointed to compete in Miss Grand International 2016 in Las Vegas, Nevada, United States, placing as semifinalist (Top 20).
Nitya Ardila (Delta Amacuro) placed as semifinalist (Top 10) in Miss Continentes Unidos 2015 in Guayaquil, Ecuador.

Gala Interactiva de la Belleza (Interactive Beauty Gala)

This preliminary event took place on September 13, 2014 at the Estudio 1 de Venevisión, co-hosted by Mariela Celis and Alyz Henrich. The following awards were given:

External links

Miss Venezuela Official Website

Miss Venezuela
2014 beauty pageants
2014 in Venezuela